Robert Wallace may refer to:

Politicians
Ben Wallace (politician) (Robert Ben Wallace, born 1970), British MP for Wyre and Preston North
Robert Wallace (MP for Greenock) (1773–1855), Scottish politician, MP for Greenock, 1832–45
Robert Wallace (Canadian politician) (1820–1899), Canadian Member of Parliament
Robert Wallace (Edinburgh MP) (1831–1899), British Member of Parliament for Edinburgh East, 1886–99
Sir Robert Wallace (Perth MP) (1850–1939), Irish-born politician, MP for Perth, 1895–1907
Robert M. Wallace (1856–1942), United States Representative from Arkansas
Robert Wallace (British Army officer) (1860–1929), Irish lawyer, soldier and politician
Jim Wallace, Baron Wallace of Tankerness (James Robert Wallace, born 1954), British Liberal Democrat Life Peer and MP for Orkney and Shetland, 1983-2001

Religious figures
Robert Wallace (bishop) (died 1669), Bishop of the Isles, Scotland
Robert Wallace (minister) (1697–1771), minister of the Church of Scotland and writer on population
Robert Wallace (Unitarian) (1791–1850), English Unitarian minister

Others
Robert Charles Wallace (1881–1955), Scottish-born Canadian geologist, educator, and administrator
Robert Strachan Wallace (1882–1961), Australian academic, Vice-Chancellor of the University of Sydney, 1928–47
Robert Wallace (biologist), discoverer of the Madidi titi, also known as the GoldenPalace.com monkey
Robert Wallace (poet) (1932–1999), American poet and professor
Robert Wallace (footballer) (1905–?), Scottish footballer
Robert Wallace (professor) (1853–1939), Scottish professor of agriculture

See also
Bobby Wallace (disambiguation)
Robert Wallis (disambiguation)
Robert Waleys, MP for Ipswich
Wallace (surname)
SS Robert Wallace, a lake freighter that sank in 1902